André Becquet was a Belgian field hockey player who competed in the 1920 Summer Olympics. He was a member of the Belgian field hockey team, which won the bronze medal.

References

External links
 
Profile

Belgian male field hockey players
Olympic field hockey players of Belgium
Field hockey players at the 1920 Summer Olympics
Olympic bronze medalists for Belgium
Year of death missing
Olympic medalists in field hockey
Year of birth missing
Medalists at the 1920 Summer Olympics
20th-century Belgian people